Tylor Ongwae (born 15 July 1991) is a Kenyan basketball player for BC Parma and .

Professional career
Ongwae averaged 10 points and five rebounds per game during the 2019-20 season with Bakken. He re-signed with the Bears on March 22, 2020. In 2020-21 and 2021-22, he earned All-Danish Basketligaen Defensive Player of the Year honours.

In 2022, he left Bakken after four years to move to Russian side BC Parma.

Kenyan national team
Ongwae has been part of Kenya's national team. He helped the team capture the silver medal at FIBA AfroCan 2019 and played for Kenya at the AfroBasket 2021 in Kigali, Rwanda.

Personal
Tylor Ongwae was raised in Eldoret Kenya a town famed for producing world famous marathoners and athletes like Eliud Kipchoge. He has two siblings who also play basketball.

References

1991 births
Living people
Alumni of Friends School Kamusinga
Bakken Bears players
Kenyan expatriate sportspeople in Switzerland
Kenyan expatriate basketball people in the United States
Kenyan men's basketball players
Louisiana–Monroe Warhawks men's basketball players
Parma Basket players
People from Uasin Gishu County
Ranger Rangers men's basketball players
SAM Basket players
Södertälje Kings players
Taranaki Mountainairs players
Kenyan expatriate sportspeople in New Zealand
Kenyan expatriate sportspeople in Sweden
Kenyan expatriate sportspeople in Denmark
Kenyan expatriate sportspeople in Russia